Earl Leathen Warrick (September 23, 1911 – November 15, 2002) was an American industrial chemist at Dow Corning who is noted for his claim to being the inventor of Silly Putty.

Warrick was the 1976 recipient of the Charles Goodyear Medal.

External links

References

1911 births
2002 deaths
Polymer scientists and engineers